Martin A. Zoll (November 12, 1900 – October 14, 1968) was a professional football player who was an original member of the Green Bay Packers. He played for the Packers beginning in 1919, two years before the team joined the National Football League. He was also a wrestler. His career ended after the 1922 season. He was also the brother of teammate Carl Zoll and future-Packer Dick Zoll. Zoll died at a hospital in Green Bay on October 14, 1968.

Notes

References

Birth of a Team and a Legend
1919-1920 Green Bay Packers

External links

1900 births
1968 deaths
Players of American football from Wisconsin
Green Bay Packers players
People from Howard, Wisconsin